In music theory, chord substitution is the technique of using a chord in place of another in a progression of chords, or a chord progression. Much of the European classical repertoire and the vast majority of blues, jazz and rock music songs are based on chord progressions. "A chord substitution occurs when a chord is replaced by another that is made to function like the original. Usually substituted chords possess two pitches in common with the triad that they are replacing."

A chord progression may be repeated to form a song or tune. Composers, songwriters and arrangers have developed a number of ways to add variety to a repeated chord progression. There are many ways to add variety to music, including changing the dynamics (loudness and softness).

Use in classical music
In J. S. Bach's St Matthew Passion, the chorale "Herzliebster Jesu" makes its first appearance in a straightforward harmonisation:

Later, as the Passion Story draws towards its sombre conclusion, we find "a more chromatic and emotional setting of the melody" that passes through "no less than ten chords with grinding chromatic steps in the bass":

The well-known theme of the second movement of Joseph Haydn's String Quartet, Op. 76 No. 3 is harmonized simply at the start:

Haydn later "reharmonizes the theme". Hans Keller calls this "the fullest and richest statement" of the famous melody: "In the second bar, for instance, there even is a turn to the relative minor":

The diminished triad can be used to substitute for the dominant seventh chord. In major scales, a diminished triad occurs only on the seventh scale degree. For instance, in the key of C, this is a B diminished triad (B, D, F). Since the triad is built on the seventh scale degree, it is also called the leading-tone triad. This chord has a dominant function. Unlike the dominant triad or dominant seventh, the leading-tone triad functions as a prolongational chord rather than a structural chord since the strong root motion by fifth is absent.

Use in blues, jazz and rock music

Jazz musicians often substitute chords in the original progression to create variety and add interest to a piece.

The substitute chord must have some harmonic quality and degree of function in common with the original chord, and often only differs by one or two notes. Scott DeVeaux describes a "penchant in modern jazz for harmonic substitution."

One simple type of chord substitution is to replace a given chord with a chord that has the same function. Thus, in the simple chord progression I–ii–V–I, which in the key of C major would be the chords C Major–d minor–G Major–C Major, a musician could replace the I chords with "tonic substitutes". The most widely used substitutes are iii and vi (in a Major key), which in this case would be the chords "e minor" and "a minor".

This simple chord progression with tonic substitutes could become iii–ii–V–vi or, with chord names, "e minor–d minor–G Major–a minor". Given the overlap in notes between the original tonic chords and the chord substitutes (for example, C major is the notes "C, E, and G", and "e minor" is the notes "E, G and B"), the melody is likely to be supported by the new chords. The musician typically applies a sense of the musical style and harmonic suitability to determine if the chord substitution works with the melody.

There are also subdominant substitutes and dominant substitutes. For subdominant chords, in the key of C major, in the chord progression C major/F major/G7/C major (a simple I /IV/V7/I progression), the notes of the subdominant chord, F major, are "F, A, and C". As such, a performer or arranger who wished to add variety to the song could try using a chord substitution for a repetition of this progression. One simple chord substitute for IV is the "ii" chord, a minor chord built on the second scale degree. In the key of C major, the "ii" chord is "d minor", which is the notes "D, F, and A". As there are two shared notes between the IV and "ii" chords, a melody that works well over IV is likely to be supported by the "ii" chord.

Types

The ii–V substitution is when a chord or each chord in a progression is preceded by its supertonic (ii7) and dominant (V7), or simply its dominant. For example, a C major chord would be preceded by Dm7 and G7. Since secondary dominant chords are often inserted between the chords of a progression rather than replacing one, this may be considered as 'addition' rather than 'substitution'.

Chord quality alteration is when the quality of a chord is changed, and the new chord of similar root and construction, but with one pitch different, is substituted for the original chord, for example the minor sixth for the major seventh, or the major seventh for the minor.

The diminished seventh chord is often used in place of a dominant 7th chord. In the key of A Major the V chord, E dominant 7th (which is made up the notes E, G, B, and D) can be replaced with a G diminished seventh chord (G, B, D, F). If the diminished seventh chord (G) is followed by the I chord (A), this creates chromatic (stepwise semitonal) root movement, which can add musical interest in a song mainly constructed around the interval of the fourth or fifth. The diminished seventh chord on the sharpened second scale degree, II7, may be used as a substitute dominant, for example in C: II7 = D–F–A–C ↔ B–D–F–A = VII7.

In a tritone substitution, the substitute chord only differs slightly from the original chord. If the original chord in a song is G7 (G, B, D, F), the tritone substitution would be D7 (D, F, A, C). Note that the 3rd and 7th notes of the G7 chord are found in the D7 chord (albeit with a change of role). The tritone substitution is widely used for V7 chords in the popular jazz chord progression "ii-V-I". In the key of C, this progression is "d minor, G7, C Major". With tritone substitution, this progression would become "d minor, D7, C Major," which contains chromatic root movement. When performed by the bass player, this chromatic root movement creates a smooth-sounding progression. "Tritone substitutions and altered dominants are nearly identical...Good improvisers will liberally sprinkle their solos with both devices. A simple comparison of the notes generally used with the given chord [notation] and the notes used in tri-tone substitution or altered dominants will reveal a rather stunning contrast, and could cause the unknowledgeable analyzer to suspect errors. ...(the distinction between the two [tri-tone substitution and altered dominant] is usually a moot point).".

Tonic substitution is the use of chords that sound similar to the tonic chord (or I chord) in place of the tonic. In major keys, the chords iii and vi are often substituted for the I chord, to add interest. In the key of C major, the I major 7 chord is "C, E, G, B," the iii chord ("III–7") is E minor 7 ("E, G, B, D") and the vi minor 7 chord is A minor 7 ("A, C, E, G"). Both of the tonic substitute chords use notes from the tonic chord, which means that they usually support a melody originally designed for the tonic (I) chord.

The relative major/minor substitution shares two common tones and is so called because it involves the relation between major and minor keys with the same key signatures, such as C major and A minor.

The augmented triad on the fifth scale degree may be used as a substitute dominant, and may also be considered as III+, for example in C: V+ = G–B–D, III+ = E–G–B, and since in every key: D = E.

The chord a minor third above, VII7, may be substituted for the dominant, and may be preceded by its ii: iv7. Due to common use the two chords of the backdoor progression (IV7-VII7) may be substituted for the dominant chord. In C major the dominant would be G7: GBDF, sharing two common tones with B7: BDFA. A and F serve as upper leading-tones back to G and E, respectively, rather than B and F serving as the lower and upper leading-tones to C and E.

Application
In jazz, chord substitutions can be applied by composers, arrangers, or performers. Composers may use chord substitutions when they are basing a new jazz tune on an existing chord progression from an old jazz standard or a song from a musical; arrangers for a big band or jazz orchestra may use chord substitutions in their arrangement of a tune, to add harmonic interest or give a different "feel" to a song; and instrumentalists may use chord substitutions in their performance of a song. Given that many jazz songs have repetition of internal sections, such as with a 32-bar AABA song form, performers or arrangers may use chord substitution within the A sections to add variety to the song.

Jazz comping instruments (piano, guitar, organ, vibes) often use chord substitution to add harmonic interest to a jazz tune with slow harmonic change. For example, the jazz standard chord progression of "rhythm changes" uses a simple eight bar chord progression in the bridge with the chords III7, VI7, II7, V7; in the key of B, these chords are D7, G7, C7, and F7 (each for two bars). A jazz guitarist might add a ii–V7 aspect to each chord, which would make the progression: "a minor, D7, d minor, G7, g minor, C7, c minor, F7. Alternatively, tritone substitutions could be applied to the progression.

Theoretically, any chord can substitute for any other chord, as long as the new chord supports the melody. In practice, though, only a few options sound musically and stylistically appropriate to a given melody. This technique is used in music such as bebop or fusion to provide more sophisticated harmony, or to create a new-sounding re-harmonization of an old jazz standard.

Jazz soloists and improvisers also use chord substitutions to help them add interest to their improvised solos. Jazz soloing instruments that can play chords, such as jazz guitar, piano, and organ players may use substitute chords to develop a chord solo over an existing jazz tune with slow-moving harmonies. Also, jazz improvisers may use chord substitution as a mental framework to help them create more interesting-sounding solos. For example, a saxophonist playing an improvised solo over the basic "rhythm changes" bridge (in B, this is "D7, G7, C7, and F7", each for two bars) might think of a more complex progression that uses substitute chords (e.g., "a minor, D7, d minor, G7, g minor, C7, c minor, F7). In doing so, this implies the substitute chords over the original progression, which adds interest for listeners.

See also
Coltrane changes
Passing chord

References

Further reading
R., Ken (2012). DOG EAR Tritone Substitution for Jazz Guitar, Amazon,